The Joint Ocean Observation Station is a planned maritime observatory to be built on Makunudhoo in the Maldives, to be operated by the State Oceanic Administration of China and the Ministry of Environment and Energy of the Maldives.

Military use
The Government of India and oppositional Maldivian Democratic Party have argued that the observatory will be used for military applications by China.

The Ministry of Foreign Affairs of the People's Republic of China has denied that the observatory will serve any military purpose.

References

Foreign relations of the Maldives
China–Maldives relations